Al-Arabi Club is a football club based in Irbid, Jordan which currently competes in the Jordan League.

Current squad

Current technical staff

Managerial History
 Fares Shdifat (?-2009)
 Kadhim Khalaf (2009–2010)
 Osama Qasem (2010)
 Muneer Masbah (2010–2011)
 Mustafa Al-Lubani (2011–2012)
 Hisham Khalf (2011)
 Issa Al-Turk (2012)
 Maher Bahri (2012–2013)
 Ahmed Sobh (2013)
 Kadhim Khalaf (2013–2014)
 Bega (2014)
 Mohammad Al-Ababneh (2014)

Honours

Jordan FA Cup
Winners (1): 1986

Kit Providers
Adidas
Uhlsport
Adidas F50
Jako
Puma

External links

Soccerway profile

Football clubs in Jordan
Sport in Irbid
1945 establishments in Transjordan